Andreas Wihlborg (born 18 January 1987) is a Swedish former footballer. He used to be a member of Sweden national under-21 football team.

References

External links 
 
 
 

1987 births
Living people
Swedish footballers
Association football midfielders
Sweden under-21 international footballers
Malmö FF players
Trelleborgs FF players
Lyngby Boldklub players
Östers IF players
BK Höllviken players
Allsvenskan players
Danish 1st Division players
Superettan players
Ettan Fotboll players
Swedish expatriate footballers
Expatriate men's footballers in Denmark
Swedish expatriate sportspeople in Denmark